Wardley Hall is an early medieval manor house and a Grade I listed building in the Wardley area of Worsley, Salford, in Greater Manchester (historically within Lancashire).. There has been a moat on the site since at least 1292. The current hall dates from around 1500 but was extensively rebuilt in the 19th and 20th centuries. The 1894 restoration was carried out by John Douglas. The building is timber framed with a slate roof.

The skull of St Ambrose Barlow, one of the Forty Martyrs of England and Wales, is preserved in a niche at the top of the main staircase. He was hanged, drawn and quartered at Lancaster on 10 September 1641 after confessing to being a Catholic priest. According to legend, it is a screaming skull.

Wardley Hall is the official residence of the Roman Catholic Bishop of Salford.

See also

Grade I listed buildings in Greater Manchester
Listed buildings in Worsley
List of houses and associated buildings by John Douglas

References

External links

1898 – Wardley Hall, Lancashire

Grade I listed buildings in Greater Manchester
Buildings and structures in the City of Salford
John Douglas buildings
Country houses in Greater Manchester
Houses completed in the 16th century